The 1953 VFL Lightning Premiership was an Australian rules football knockout competition played entirely on Tuesday, 2 June. It was played on the same day as Elizabeth II's Coronation between rounds 6 and 7 of the Victorian Football League's 1953 season with all games played at the MCG. This was the sixth time a lightning premiership had been contested in the VFL. It was contested by the 12 VFL teams who competed in the 1953 VFL season. A total of 36,715 people attended the competition. Richmond won its first Lighting Premiership competition defeating St Kilda in the final by 14 points.

Matches

Round 1

|- bgcolor="#CCCCFF"
| Home team
| Home team score
| Away team
| Away team score
| Ground
| Date
|- bgcolor="#FFFFFF"
| Melbourne
| 1.1 (7)
| South Melbourne
| 1.2 (8)
| MCG
| Tuesday, 2 June
|- bgcolor="#FFFFFF"
| Carlton
| 0.1 (1)
| St Kilda
| 2.1 (13)
| MCG
| Tuesday, 2 June
|- bgcolor="#FFFFFF"
| Collingwood
| 3.2 (20)
| Footscray
| 0.2 (2)
| MCG
| Tuesday, 2 June
|- bgcolor="#FFFFFF"
| Richmond
| 4.2 (26)
| Fitzroy
| 2.0 (12)
| MCG
| Tuesday, 2 June
|- bgcolor="#FFFFFF"
| Essendon
| 2.2 (14)
| Geelong
| 1.3 (9)
| MCG
| Tuesday, 2 June
|- bgcolor="#FFFFFF"
| Hawthorn
| 3.5 (23)
| North Melbourne
| 2.2 (14)
| MCG
| Tuesday, 2 June

Quarter finals

|- bgcolor="#CCCCFF"
| Home team
| Home team score
| Away team
| Away team score
| Ground
| Date
|- bgcolor="#FFFFFF"
| South Melbourne
| 2.2 (14)
| St Kilda
| 3.3 (21)
| MCG
| Tuesday, 2 June
|- bgcolor="#FFFFFF"
| Footscray
| 0.3 (3)
| Richmond
| 1.2 (8)
| MCG
| Tuesday, 2 June
|- bgcolor="#CCCCFF"
|colspan=6 style="text-align:center;"| Bye: Essendon, Hawthorn

Semi finals

|- bgcolor="#CCCCFF"
| Home team
| Home team score
| Away team
| Away team score
| Ground
| Date
|- bgcolor="#FFFFFF"
| Essendon
| 2.1 (13)
| St Kilda
| 2.5 (17)
| MCG
| Tuesday, 2 June
|- bgcolor="#FFFFFF"
| Hawthorn
| 1.0 (6)
| Richmond
| 1.1 (7)
| MCG
| Tuesday, 2 June

Grand final

|- bgcolor="#CCCCFF"
| Home team
| Home team score
| Away team
| Away team score
| Ground
| Date
|- bgcolor="#FFFFFF"
| St Kilda
| 1.3 (9)
| Richmond
| 3.5 (23)
| MCG
| Tuesday, 2 June

See also
List of Australian Football League night premiers
Australian Football League pre-season competition
1953 VFL season

Australian Football League pre-season competition
Vfl Lightning Premiership, 1953